The 10th TCA Awards were presented by the Television Critics Association. Ellen DeGeneres hosted the ceremony at the Universal City Hilton and Towers on July 22, 1994. DeGeneres was the first celebrity guest to host the TCA Awards.

Winners and nominees

Multiple nominations 
The following shows received multiple nominations:

References

External links
Official website 
1994 TCA Awards at IMDb.com

1994 television awards
1994 in American television
TCA Awards ceremonies